Carbonate is a comune (municipality) in the Province of Como in the Italian region Lombardy, located about  northwest of Milan and about  southwest of Como.

The municipality of Carbonate contains the frazioni (subdivisions, mainly villages and hamlets) Cascina Cipollina, Cascina Abbondanza, Moneta, and La Pinetina.

Carbonate borders the following municipalities: Appiano Gentile, Gorla Maggiore, Locate Varesino, Lurago Marinone, Mozzate, Tradate.

Demographic evolution

References

External links
 www.comune.carbonate.co.it

Cities and towns in Lombardy